Adel El-Sharkawy (born October 27, 1966) is an Egyptian handball player. He competed for Egypt's national team at the 1992 Summer Olympics.

References 

1966 births
Living people
Egyptian male handball players
Olympic handball players of Egypt
Handball players at the 1992 Summer Olympics